Wesley Webb West (January 25, 1924 – November 15, 2003), better known as Speedy West, was an American pedal steel guitarist and record producer. He frequently played with Jimmy Bryant, both in their own duo and as part of the regular Capitol Records backing band for Tennessee Ernie Ford and many others. The duo also recorded with non-Capitol artists in Los Angeles. In 1960, Speedy played on and produced Loretta Lynn's first single. During his time at Capitol, he played on over 6000 recordings, including pop records by artists like Frank Sinatra and Bing Crosby. West, who began playing Paul Bigsby's second ever pedal steel guitar in 1947, was the first country steel guitarist to use a pedal guitar. Nashville players like Bud Isaacs would adopt it in the early 1950s. After a stroke in 1981, West was unable to play pedal steel, but would continue to attend steel guitar conventions. His health would continue to deteriorate and he would pass away on November 15, 2003.

References

External links
 Speedy West at the Rockabilly Hall of Fame
Speedy West Interview NAMM Oral History Library, May 17, 2002.
Wesley Webb “Speedy” West on Find A Grave.

1924 births
2003 deaths
Musicians from Springfield, Missouri
American country guitarists
American male guitarists
Steel guitarists
Western swing performers
20th-century American guitarists
Pedal steel guitarists
Guitarists from Missouri
Country musicians from Missouri
20th-century American male musicians